Jatun Ch'utu (Quechua jatun big, ch'utu cone, "big cone", also spelled Jatun Chutu) is a mountain in the Bolivian Andes which reaches a height of approximately . It is located in the Cochabamba Department, Mizque Province, Alalay Municipality.

References 

Mountains of Cochabamba Department